Naousa (historically Νάουσσα - Naoussa), officially The Heroic City of Naousa is a city in the Imathia regional unit of Macedonia, Greece with a population of 21,139 (2016). 
An industrial center since the 19th century, for most of the 20th century the history of Naousa was closely intertwined with that of the Lanaras family, local industrialists who, at the height of their influence, employed almost half of Naousa's population in their textile factories. The Lanaras family built hospitals, social centers etc. while streets of Naousa were named after family members. In the 1990s and 2000s however, most of the local factories closed, leaving Naousa with a serious (and still unresolved) unemployment problem.

Municipality
The municipality Naousa was formed at the 2011 local government reform by the merger of the following 3 former municipalities, that became municipal units:
Anthemia
Eirinoupoli
Naousa

The municipality has an area of 425.491 km2, the municipal unit 300.891 km2.

Province
The province of Naousa was one of the provinces of Imathia. It had the same territory as the present municipality. It was abolished in 2006.

History

The city is situated in ancient Emathia west of the ancient Macedonian town of Mieza and the site of ancient School of Aristotle. The area, according to Herodotus, was where the fertile Gardens of King Midas were situated. Later, in the current position of the city, the Romans established the colony of Nova Augusta. The name changed through the centuries to Niagusta,  Niaousta and Niaousa, until it became today's Naousa. It was known as "Ağustos" during Ottoman rule.

In 1705, an armatolos named Zisis Karademos led a Greek uprising against the local Ottoman garrison.

In 1822, during the Greek War of Independence, the fighting in Central Macedonia against the Turks came to a dramatic finale in Naousa. Abdul Abud, the Pasha of Thessaloniki, arrived on 14 March at the head of a 16,000 strong force and 12 cannons. The Greeks defended Naousa with a force of 4,000 under Anastasios Karatasos, Dimitrios Karatasos, Aggelis Gatsos, Karamitsos and Philippos, the son of Zafeirakis Theodosiou, under the overall command of Zafeirakis Theodosiou and Anastasios Karatasos. The Turks attempted to take the town of Naousa on 16 March, and again on 18 and 19 March, without success. On 24 March the Turks began a bombardment of the city walls that lasted for several days. After requests for the town's surrender were dismissed by the Greeks, the Turks charged the Gate of St George on Good Friday, 31 March. The Turkish attack failed but on 6 April, after receiving fresh reinforcements of some 3,000 men, the Turkish army finally overcame the Greek resistance and entered the city. In an infamous incident, as the rebels were abandoning the town, some of the women left behind committed suicide by falling down a cliff over the small river Arapitsa. Zafeirakis Theodosiou was pursued by a Turkish unit and was killed. The other Greek leaders retreated southwards. Abdul Abud laid the town and surrounding area to waste. The fall and massacre of Naousa marked the end of the Greek Revolution in Central Macedonia.  A notable survivor of the incident was Greek American refugee Gregory Anthony Perdicaris.

Naousa has small minorities of Aromanians and Romani.

Geography

Naousa is located in Northwestern Imathia, 22 kilometers north of Veroia and 90 kilometers west of Thessaloniki, the biggest city in Northern Greece. The city lies on the eastern foothills of Vermio Mountains, one of the biggest mountain ranges in Greece, and west to the plain of Kambania (or Giannitsa). Naousa is today the largest forest-owning municipality in the country being also surrounded by orchards, producing peaches, apples, cherries and other fruits, while the jam brand name Naousa is well-known all over Greece.  Naousa is also known for its parks (Municipal Park, Park of Saint Nicholas etc.) and for its ski resorts (3-5 Pigadia and Seli). Due to its location, altitude can raise by as much as 150m between the lowest and highest parts of the city, and it reaches nearly 550m in the Park of Saint Nicholas. Naousa is also home of one of the three female named Greek rivers, Arapitsa, together with Neda in Peloponnesus and Erkyna in Livadia.

Climate

Naousa has a humid subtropical climate (Cfa) in the Köppen climate classification but due to its inland location and elevation, is more continental (and less Mediterranean) than that found in most Greek cities. It is heavily influenced by the mountains which rise rapidly up to the west, and by the plain of Kambania to the east. On one hand, the mountains shelter the area from cold winds blowing from the north and west down the Balkan Peninsula and also from hot southwest winds, creating a non-extreme microclimate. On the other they create föhn winds, which draw in cool, damp air from the Aegean coast. The annual precipitation of Naousa is typically lower than in western Greece, but it is one of the highest in the Macedonia region, measuring around 710 mm per year. Winters can be cold and Vermio mountains are home to two of the most famous skiing resorts in Greece, Seli and 3-5 Pigadia. In the city, snowfall is not uncommon (snow falls at an average of 10–15 days per year) and measurable amounts of snow can remain on the ground for several days. Typically, downtown Naousa experiences milder winter temperatures than the suburbs where temperatures can drop many degrees below zero. Recent years have been a lot warmer and the 2007 European heat wave saw Naousa reaching 40 °C for the first time in recent memory, with an absolute maximum of 41.3 °C in July 25. On January 8, 2017, temperature dropped to -10.5 °C, which is a 10-year low.

Transport 
Naoussa is served by Naousa railway station on the Thessaloniki-Florina line. Inaugurated in 1894, it connects the city with Thessaloniki and the rest of Northern Greece. Since 2009, it is served by the suburban services to Thessaloniki and Edessa.

Sports
Skiing club EOS Naousas is the oldest of the city's sporting clubs, having been founded in 1932. Naoussa also hosts the clubs Naoussa F.C., which played at First National Division of Greece for one year (season 1993–94) and EGS Zafeirakis Naousas that competes at volleyball, handball and basketball. The name refers to the Greek prokritos Zafeirakis Theodosiou (1772–1822).

International relations

Twin towns — Sister cities
Naousa, Imathia is twinned with:

 Missolonghi, Greece
 Naousa, Paros, Greece
 Faches-Thumesnil, France (1992)
 Asenovgrad, Bulgaria (1994)
 Zgorzelec, Poland (1998)

Notable people 
Anastasios Michail (17th century-1722), theologian
Zisis Karademos(17th century-1705), armatolos, led a rebellion
Gregory Anthony Perdicaris (1810-1883), first U.S. Consul to Greece, Author
Zafeirakis Theodosiou (18th century-1822), political leader
Lappas bros (19th century), merchants and benefactors of the city
Grigorios Longos, textile industrialist
Eleni Tsaligopoulou (1963-), Greek singer
Konstantinos Prousalis (1980-), Greek volleyball player
Sophia Ralli (1988-), Alpine skier, 3-time Olympian, Greece's flag bearer at the 2018 Winter Olympic Games
Apostolos Giannou (1990-), Greek-Australian footballer

Gallery

See also

List of settlements in Imathia
Folklore Museum of the Lyceum of Hellenic Women
Wine and Vine Museum
Mieza (Macedonia)

References

Populated places in Imathia
Municipalities of Central Macedonia
Wine regions of Greece
Provinces of Greece
Roman towns and cities in Greece
Aromanian settlements in Greece